William, Billy or Bill Stone may refer to:

Politicians
 William Stone (MP for Salisbury), member of parliament (MP) for Salisbury
 William Stone (Maryland governor) (1603–1660), governor of the colony of Maryland
 William Stone (Tennessee politician) (1791–1853), U.S. Representative from Tennessee
 William H. Stone (politician), California politician
 William M. Stone (1827–1893), governor of Iowa
 William Henry Stone (1828–1901), U.S. representative from Missouri
 William Henry Stone (physician) (1830–1891), English physician, Fellow of the Royal College of Physicians
 William Henry Stone (MP) (1834–1896), British politician, MP for Portsmouth (1865–1874)
 William Johnson Stone (1841–1923), U.S. representative from Kentucky
 William A. Stone (1846–1920), governor of Pennsylvania
 William J. Stone (1848–1918), governor of Missouri
 William F. Stone (1909–1973), Virginia lawyer and legislator
 William Frank Stone, former Canadian ambassador to Afghanistan (1977–1978)
 Bill Stone (politician) (born 1965), member of the Mississippi State Senate

Sports
 Billy Stone (rugby), English rugby union and rugby league footballer of the 1910s and 1920s
 Bill Stone (footballer) (1894–1975), Australian rules footballer for Fitzroy
 Billy Stone (Australian footballer) (1901–1993), Australian rules footballer for Carlton
 Billy Stone (American football) (1925–2004), American football running back
 Billy Stone (arena football) (born 1963), former American football fullback

Military
 Bill Stone (Royal Navy sailor) (1900–2009), one of the last surviving British veterans of the First World War
 William S. Stone (1910–1968), U.S. Air Force general and U.S. Air Force Academy superintendent

Others
 William Murray Stone (1779–1838), American Episcopal bishop of Maryland
 William Leete Stone Sr. (1792–1844), American journalist, publisher and public official in New York City
 William Oliver Stone (1830–1875), American portrait painter
 William Leete Stone Jr. (1835–1908), American historical writer and journalist
 William Stone (attorney) (1842–1897), American Freedmen's Bureau agent, Attorney General of South Carolina
 William Carlos Stone (1859–1939), American engineer and philatelist
 W. Clement Stone (1902–2002), American businessman, philanthropist and self-help book author
 William Duncan Stone, Hong Kong judge, see Silver Bauhinia Star (received in 2011)
 Bill Stone (nephrologist) (1936–2020), American nephrologist
 William Stone (baritone) (born 1944), American operatic baritone
 William Stone (caver) (born 1952), American engineer, expeditionary caver and explorer
 William C. Stone (born 1955), American businessman (chairman and CEO of SS&C Technologies)

See also
 William Stones (1904–1969), British politician